Janice C. Stork (born ?) is an American politician, businesswoman, and member of the Democratic Party. Stork was elected as the first female Mayor of Lancaster, Pennsylvania, on November 7, 1989, defeating Republican challenger, Mary Lou Broucht. Stork, who had previously served on the Lancaster City Council, served as Mayor for two, consecutive four-year terms from January 1990 until January 1998.

Stork narrowly won re-election to second term in November 1993. She defeated former Lancaster County Commissioner Brad S. Fischer, by only 255 votes, or 2.2%, the second-closest mayoral election in the city's history.

She retired from office in January 1998 and was succeeded by Republican Mayor Charlie Smithgall.

References

Living people
Mayors of Lancaster, Pennsylvania
Pennsylvania city council members
Businesspeople from Pennsylvania
Pennsylvania Democrats
Women city councillors in Pennsylvania
Women mayors of places in Pennsylvania
Year of birth missing (living people)
21st-century American women